Isabel de Pomés (10 April 1924 – 31 May 2007) was a classic Spanish film actress and one of the leading ladies in Spanish cinema of the 1940s and 1950s.

She appeared in over 30 films between 1941 and 1965.

Her father was the actor and sportsman Félix de Pomés.

Selected filmography
El Puente de la Ilusion (1965)
Salto a la Gloria 1959
 Night and Dawn (1958)
Amanecer en Puerta Oscura1957
Un ángel Paso por Brooklyn 1957
Marcelino Pan y Vino 1954
 The Mayor of Zalamea (1954)
 The King's Mail (1951)
Luna de Sangre (1950)
Vida en Sombras (1948)
Botón de Ancla (1947)
 The Black Siren (1947)
Cancion de Medianoche 1947
The Tower of the Seven Hunchbacks 1944 by Edgar Neville
Traces of Light 1943
Noche Fantastica 1943
Vidas Cruzadas 1942
Los Millones de Polichinela (1941)

External links
 

Spanish film actresses
1924 births
2007 deaths
Actresses from Barcelona